The Taitung Performing Art Center is a performance center in Taitung City, Taitung County, Taiwan.

History
The center was established by Taitung Theater in 2004 as a venue for local artists showcasing their talents.

See also
 List of tourist attractions in Taiwan

References

2004 establishments in Taiwan
Buildings and structures in Taitung County
Event venues established in 2004
Performing arts centers in Taiwan